Marie-Armelle Deguy is a French actress, the daughter of poet and essayist Michel Deguy.

Filmography

Cinema 
1988: La Septième dimension by Laurent Dussaux
1988: Zanzibar by Christine Pascal
1988: L'Enfance de l'art by Francis Girod
1990: Lacenaire by Francis Girod
1991: Sushi Sushi by Laurent Perrin
1993: La Naissance de l'amour by Philippe Garrel
1997: Une femme très très très amoureuse by Ariel Zeitoun
1999: Une saison by Brigitte Coscas
1999: La vie ne me fait pas peur by Noémie Lvovsky
1999: La Tentation de l'innocence by Fabienne Godet
2001: Gregoire Moulin vs. Humanity by Artus de Penguern
2001: Liberté-Oléron by Bruno Podalydès
2002: A Private Affair by Guillaume Nicloux
2003: À la petite semaine by Sam Karmann
2006: I Do by Éric Lartigau
2007: La Môme by Olivier Dahan
2007: Have Mercy on Us All by Régis Wargnier
2009: La Sainte Victoire by François Favrat
2011: The Women on the 6th Floor by Philippe Le Guay
2012: Une place sur la terre by Fabienne Godet
2014: Maestro by Léa Fazer

Television 
1984: Diderot by Philippe Leguay
1991: La haine sous abri by D.Giuliani
1992: Banco machinations by Gérard Vergez
1992: Aerenshehawhe by Jean Baudin
1992: Antoine Rives, juge du terrorisme by Philippe Lefevre
1995: La place royale by Benoît Jacquot
1995: L'allée du roi by Nina Companeez
1997: Petites by Noémie Lvovsky
1998: Profession profileur by Patrick Dewolf
1998: Crimes en série, episodes Nature Morte and Double spirale by Patrick Dewolf
1999: Joséphine, ange gardien, episode Une nouvelle vie by Philippe Monnier
1999: Brigade des mineurs, Suicide d'un adolescent by Michaela Watteaux
2000: Le complexe d'Olympe by Laurence Katrian
2001: Un Pique-nique chez Osiris by Nina Companeez
2002 and 2003: Crimes en série by Patrick Dewolf
2004: Louis la brocante, fifth season, episode Louis et la vie de château by Alain-Michel Blanc
2004: Julie Lescaut, 13th season, episode 9, by Bernard Uzan : Céline Hélier
2004: L'Instit, episode 46, Ma petite star by Bruno Dega
2006: Nos familles by Siegrid Alnoy
2007: Les Tricheurs by Laurent Carcélès
2008: Nos enfants chéris by Benoît Cohen
2008: Un flic by Patrick Dewolf
2009: Vénus et Apollon (season 2) by Tonie Marshall
2009: Julie Lescaut by Jérôme Navarro
2009: Le chasseur by Nicolas Cuche
2009: Les Bougons by Sam Karmann
2009: Les Bleus by Alain Tasma
2010: L'écornifleur by Philippe Bérenger
2010: Drôle de famille ! by Benoît d'Aubert
2010: Julie Lescaut, season 19, episode 2 Contre la montre by Jérôme Navarro: the judge
2011: Dans la peau d'une grande by Pascal Lahmani
2011: Le Bon samaritain by Bruno Garcia
2012: Passage du désir by Jérôme Foulon
2012: Caïn by Bertrand Arthuys, TV series
2013: Julie Lescaut, episode Cougar by Christian Bonnet
2013: Nicolas Le Floch by Philippe Bérenger
2014: Le Chapeau de Mitterrand by Robin Davis

 Dubbing 
2008: Dorothy Mills by Agnès Merlet : Eileen McMahon (Ger Ryan)
2009: Lourdes by Jessica Hausner : Mme Huber (Linde Prelog)
2009: Dans la brume électrique by Bertrand Tavernier : Bootsie Robicheaux (Mary Steenburgen)
2011: The Solitude of Prime Numbers by Saverio Costanzo : Adèle (Isabella Rosellini)
2012: Hannah Arendt by Margarethe von Trotta : Mary McCarthy (Janet McTeer)
2012: Shadow Dancer by James Marsh : Ma (Bríd Brennan)
2014: Winter Sleep by Nuri Bilge Ceylan : Necla (Demet Akbağ)

 Theatre 
1985: Le Misanthrope by Molière, directed by André Engel à la MC93 in Bobigny
1985 to 1988: :
 Les Femmes savantes by Molière, directed by Catherine Hiegel
 Le Bourgeois gentilhomme by Molière, directed by Jean-Luc Boutté
 Le Menteur by Pierre Corneille, directed by Alain Françon
 The Balcony by Jean Genet, directed by Georges Lavaudant
1988: Sophonisbe by Pierre Corneille, directed by Brigitte Jaques at Théâtre national de Chaillot 
1988 : La Nuit des chasseurs after Woyzeck by Georg Büchner, directed by André Engel at Théâtre national de la Colline in Paris, Théâtre du Huitième in Lyon, Théâtre des Amandiers in Nanterre et en tournée en France
1990: La Dame de chez Maxim by Georges Feydeau, directed by Alain Françon at Théâtre du Huitième in Lyon et en tournée
1992: La Place royale by Pierre Corneille, directed by Brigitte Jaques au Théâtre de la Commune in Aubervilliers
1993 and 1994: Agnès by Catherine Anne at 
1994: Tchekhov actes III, by Anton Tchekhov, directed by Anastasiya Vertinskaya and Alexandre Kaliaguine at Théâtre des Amandiers
1994/1995: Angels in America by Tony Kushner, directed by Brigitte Jaques at Théâtre de la Commune
1996: Angels in America, 2nd part
1996: Surprise by Catherine Anne, directed by the author,  at la Cartoucherie
1997: Sertorius by Pierre Corneille, directed by Brigitte Jaques at Théâtre de la Commune
1998: Les Gens déraisonnables sont en voie de disparition by Peter Handke, directed by Christophe Perton at Théâtre national de la Colline
1999/2000: Love's Labour's Lost by William Shakespeare, directed by Emmanuel Demarcy-Mota at Théâtre de la Ville
2000: Hedda Gabler by Henrik Ibsen, directed by Brigitte Jaques at the 
2001: A Message for the Broken Hearted  by Gregory Motton, directed by Frédéric Bélier-Garcia at Théâtre de l'Aquarium at la Cartoucherie
2000: Cendres de cailloux by Daniel Danis, directed by Hughes Massignat at Théâtre Gérard-Philipe
2002: Viol by Danièle Sallenave, directed by Brigitte Jaques at Théâtre du Rond-Point in Paris
2003: Le Bonheur du vent by Catherine Anne, directed by the author at 
2005/2006: Le Cas Blanche-Neige by Howard Barker, directed by Frédéric Maragnani at 
2007: Man Equals Man by Bertold Brecht, directed by Emmanuel Demarcy-Mota at Théâtre de la Ville
2007: Jeux doubles by Cristina Comencini, directed by Claudia Stavisky at Théâtre des Célestins in Lyon, and revival in 2008 at Théâtre de la Commune
2008: revival of Le Cas Blanche-Neige at théâtre Odéon Berthier in Paris
2009/2010: La parisienne by Henry Becque, directed by Frédéric Maragnani at 
2011: Les retrouvailles by Arthur Adamov, directed by Gabriel Garran at Théâtre de la Tempête at la Cartoucherie
2011: The Princess of Montpensier by Madame de La Fayette, directed by Jacques Vincey at Théâtre de l'Ouest parisien
2012: Le bourgeois gentilhomme by Molière, directed by Catherine Hiegel at Centre national de création d'Orléans and at Théâtre de la Porte Saint-Martin in Paris
2014: Agnès by Catherine Anne and L'École des femmes by Molière, directed by Catherine Anne au Théâtre d'Ivry-Antoine Vitez: rôle du père et Arnolphe
2015/2016: Agnès by Catherine Anne and L'École des femmes by Molière, directed by Catherine Anne at Théâtre d'Ivry-Antoine Vitez and on tour

Honours 
2014: Meilleur Second Rôle Féminin au  (Prix du Jury) for her part in Une place sur la Terre by

References

External links 
 
 Fiche d'artiste de Marie-Armelle Deguy sur agencesartistiques.com
 Fiche d'artiste de Marie-Armelle Deguy sur bagoe.com

French actresses